Rödermark-Ober Roden station is the station of the Rödermark suburb of Ober-Roden in the German state of Hesse. It is the southern terminus of line S1 of the Rhine-Main S-Bahn and a stop for Regionalbahn services on the Dreieich Railway. It is classified in station category 4 and is a hub for public transport. The station building is a listed building.

History 
Ober-Roden was connected to the railway network in 1896 with the opening of the Rodgau Railway (Rodgaubahn), which connected Offenbach (Main) Hauptbahnhof via Ober-Roden to Dieburg on the Rhine-Main Railway. The first part of the present entrance building was built during its construction. The Dreieich Railway (Dreieichbahn) was opened in 1905, running from Buchschlag on the Main-Neckar Railway via Urberach.

The modernisation of the Dreieich Railway began in 1997. Platform and tracks were rebuilt and preparations were made for the construction of a platform subway.

The station was completely rebuilt for the upgrade of the Rodgau Railway in preparation for the extension of the S-Bahn in 2003. The platform access previously provided by a pedestrian bridge was replaced by a barrier-free subway. Since then there has been direct access on the main platform between the S-Bahn and the buses. The platforms for tracks 2-4 are connected by stairs and lifts to the subway.

The conversion of the station forecourt to a substantial urban gateway began in the third quarter of 2013. The station building was renovated during this work. Various residential and shopping areas were incorporated in the building. A glass structure was planned on the site of the former northern building, which would house a catering business.

Current services
Ober-Roden stations is located in the fare zone of the Rhein-Main-Verkehrsverbund (RMV), which manages S-Bahn and Regionalbahn services as well as bus and night bus services.

Rail services
From Mondays to Fridays the station is served by 173 trains daily:
 S-Bahn line S1 runs from here via Offenbach am Main and Frankfurt Hauptbahnhof to Wiesbaden Hauptbahnhof; in the peak it runs every 15 minutes, but the additional services run only as far as Hochheim.
 The services on the Dreieich Railway run hourly between Ober-Roden and Dieburg or Frankfurt (Main) Hauptbahnhof and half hourly between Ober-Roden and Dreieich-Buchschlag. In the peak hour, additional trains that run to Frankfurt Hbf combine to create a service every 15 minutes between Ober-Roden and Dreieich-Buchschlag.

Bus services

The change from the bus to the S-Bahn requires a very short walk. The platform that adjoins track 1, which is used by S-Bahn services, serves on its other side as a bus platform. The barrier-free transfer path is only about five metres.
 Various bus routes stop on the eastern side of the station and connect Ober-Roden with the surrounding area:
 route OF-95: Neu-Isenburg – Dietzenbach – Ober-Roden – Urberach
 route 674: Ober-Roden – Dieburg – Darmstadt
 route 679: Ober-Roden – Dieburg – Groß-Zimmern – Reinheim (on Fri/Sat and Sat/Sun nights there is also a Nightliner on the Dieburg–Ober-Roden section)
 Linie X74: Ober-Roden – Eppertshausen – Münster – Darmstadt (express bus)
This adds up to about 100 bus connections per day.

Night services
Rödermark-Ober Roden station is served by several night lines.
 Weekends and nights before holidays:
 S-Bahn line S1: Wiesbaden Hbf – Frankfurt Hbf – Frankfurt Süd – Offenbach Hbf – Rodgau – Ober-Roden
 Line n66: (Frankfurt Konstablerwache –) Offenbach-Marktplatz – Heusenstamm – Dietzenbach – Ober-Roden
 Line n66 runs as line n65 without change from Frankfurt-Konstablerwache.
 Linie 679 (Nightliner): (Darmstadt Hbf –) Dieburg – Münster – Eppertshausen – Ober-Roden
 The Nightliner line 679 runs as line 672 without change from Darmstadt Hbf.
 On all other nights (normal nights from Monday to Friday):
 Linie n65:  Frankfurt Konstablerwache – Offenbach-Marktplatz – Rodgau – Ober-Roden
 In Offenbach-Marktplatz there is a connection to S-Bahn line S8 to Frankfurt.

References

External links
 

Railway stations in Hesse
Railway stations in Germany opened in 1896
Rhine-Main S-Bahn stations
Buildings and structures in Offenbach (district)